The 2014 Slovak Open was a professional tennis tournament played on indoor hard courts. It was the 15th edition of the tournament which was part of the 2014 ATP Challenger Tour. It took place in Bratislava, Slovakia between 3 and 9 November 2014.

Singles main-draw entrants

Seeds

 1 Rankings are as of October 27, 2014.

Other entrants
The following players received wildcards into the singles main draw:
  Filip Horanský
  Jozef Kovalík
  Miloslav Mečíř Jr.
  Adam Pavlásek

The following players received entry from the qualifying draw:
  Yannick Maden
  Adrian Sikora
  Pavel Štaubert
  Filip Veger

Champions

Singles

 Peter Gojowczyk def.  Farrukh Dustov 7–6(7–2), 6–3

Doubles

 Ken Skupski /  Neal Skupski def.  Norbert Gombos /  Adam Pavlásek 6–3, 7–6(7–3)

External links
Official Website

Slovak Open
Slovak Open
Slovak Open
Slovak Open